Nizhnyaya Topsa is a rural locality (a village) in Vinogradovsky District, Arkhangelsk Oblast, Russia. The population was 31 as of 2010. There are 2 streets.

Geography 
Nizhnyaya Topsa is located on the Topsa River, 62 km southeast of Bereznik (the district's administrative centre) by road. Nikitinskaya is the nearest rural locality.

References 

Rural localities in Vinogradovsky District